The condylar emissary vein is a vein connecting the suboccipital plexus of veins with the sigmoid sinus. It is clinically significant because it is a possible mode of transportation for disease into the cranium.

References

Veins of the head and neck